Marie Du Fresnay, aka Maria du Fresnay, née Daminois, was a French writer who was  born in 1809 and died in 1892.

She was the mistress of Honoré de Balzac, to whom she gave a daughter, Marie-Caroline Du Fresnay (b. 4 June 1834), the only child of the French author. Her own mother was the playwright and novelist Adèle Daminois.

She was also the mother of French knight Ange Du Fresnay and the ancestor of French writer and silent film director Guy Du Fresnay as well as of French contemporary essayist and economist Philippe Du Fresnay.

Her life inspired Honoré de Balzac's most famous novel Eugénie Grandet (1833), which depicted in part her family, who were living at the time in the French city of Sartrouville.

Biography 

In 1833, as he revealed in a letter to his sister, Honoré de Balzac entered into a secret intrigue, with Marie (aka "Maria") du Fresnay, who was then 24. Her marriage to Charles Antoine Du Fresnay, son of Charles Du Fresnay, former mayor of Sartrouville (portrayed as "Charles Grandet, nephew of the former mayor of Saumur" in Eugénie Grandet) had been a failure from the start, with a 23-year age difference between them. In this letter, Balzac reveals that the young woman had just come to tell him she was pregnant.

In 1834, 8 months following Honoré de Balzac's letter to his sister, Maria du Fresnay's daughter Marie-Caroline Du Fresnay was born.

In 1839, she appears as the dedicatee of the second edition of Honoré de Balzac's Eugenie Grandet under the pseudonym "Maria", which was her nickname in her social circle. This is also the year of birth of her second son and third child, Ange Du Fresnay.

In 1850, she would inherit a statue of French sculptor Francois Girardon from Honoré de Balzac, which confirmed the rumor of his paternity. However, the link was only confirmed in 1946, when Maria's grandson Charles du Fresnay told French journalist and historian Roger Pierrot that Marie's nickname used to be "Maria".

Bibliography 
 
 Gilbert Guislain, "Balzac", Studyrama, 2004 (page 81)

References 

1809 births
Honoré de Balzac
Year of death missing
19th-century French writers
19th-century French women
People from Sartrouville